Michael Felix Korum (born 2 November 1840 in Wickerschwihr; d. 4 December 1921 in Trier) was Bishop of Trier from  1881 to 1921.

He was appointed by Pope Leo XIII on 12 August 1881 and was ordained two days afterwards by Raffaele Monaco La Valletta.

References 
 
 Jakob Treitz: Michael Felix Korum. Bischof von Trier 1840 - 1921. Ein Lebens- und Zeitbild., Theatiner- Verlag München/ Rom 1925. 
 Eintrag über Michael Felix Korum auf catholic-hierarchy.org (englisch)
 Michael Felix Korum in den Saarländischen Biografien

19th-century German Roman Catholic bishops
Roman Catholic bishops of Trier
1840 births
1921 deaths
People from Haut-Rhin
Alsatian-German people
20th-century German Roman Catholic bishops
20th-century German Roman Catholic priests